Helen Don-Duncan (born 9 June 1981) is a female English former competitive swimmer and backstroke specialist.

Swimming career
Don-Duncan represented Great Britain in the Olympics, FINA world championships, and European championships, and swam for England in the Commonwealth Games.  At the 2000 Olympic Games in Sydney, Australia, she came 15th in the women's 200-metre backstroke.

She represented England and won a bronze medal in the 200 backstroke metres event, at the 1998 Commonwealth Games in Kuala Lumpur, Malaysia.

At the ASA National British Championships she won four consecutive 200 metres backstroke titles in 1997, 1998, 1999 and 200).

References

1981 births
Living people
Sportspeople from Wigan
Swimmers at the 1998 Commonwealth Games
Swimmers at the 2000 Summer Olympics
Olympic swimmers of Great Britain
Commonwealth Games bronze medallists for England
Medalists at the FINA World Swimming Championships (25 m)
English backstroke swimmers
English female swimmers
Commonwealth Games medallists in swimming
Medallists at the 1998 Commonwealth Games